Tongo may refer to:

Places 
Tongo, Ghana, town in Bolgatanga region of northeast Ghana
Tongo, Sierra Leone, or Tongoma, town in Kenema District of eastern Sierra Leone
 Tongo Field, home ground of its football club the Gem Stars
Tongo, Ethiopia, town in Benishangul-Gumuz Zone of Ethiopia
Tongo Island, an island of Albania in the Ionian Sea

In fiction 
Tongo (Star Trek), fictional card game
Tongo, TV apeman, visitor to Gilligan's Island

Other uses 
Tongo (entertainer) (1957–2023), a Peruvian Cumbia singer
 Tongo, common name for the red mangrove Rhizophora mangle in Tonga
Pak-Tong language, also known as Tongo, an Austronesian language of Papua New Guinea

See also

 Sranan Tongo, also known as Suriname Creole
 Togo (disambiguation)
 Tonga (disambiguation)
Tonho (name)
 Tonio (name)
Tonko